The 1924 United Kingdom general election was held on Wednesday 29 October 1924, as a result of the defeat of the Labour minority government, led by Prime Minister Ramsay MacDonald, in the House of Commons on a motion of no confidence. It was the third general election to be held in less than two years. Parliament was dissolved on 9 October.

The Conservatives, led by Stanley Baldwin, performed better, in electoral terms, than in the 1923 general election and obtained a large parliamentary majority of 209. Labour, led by MacDonald, lost 40 seats. The election also saw the Liberal Party, led by H. H. Asquith, lose 118 of their 158 seats which helped to polarise British politics between the Labour Party and the Conservative Party.

The Conservative landslide victory and the Labour defeat in this general election have been, in part, attributed to the Zinoviev letter, a forged document that was published as if it were genuine and sensationalized in the Daily Mail four days before the election. The Labour vote increased by around one million in comparison to the 1923 general election, but this was largely due to the party putting up 87 more candidates than it had in the previous election.

The Conservatives had called the previous 1923 election early to get a mandate for moving to a protectionist trade policy of imperial preference, but had lost their majority. In 1924, they reverted to free trade and regained power. They would propose protectionism in the next elections in 1929, again losing.

Overview 
After the previous general election, the Labour Party had finished as the second-largest party, but formed their first-ever government with the support of the Liberal Party, after the ruling Conservative Party's shock loss of their majority made it untenable for Baldwin to continue as Prime Minister. However, relations between Labour and the Liberals proved stormy, eventually resulting in Liberal M.P. Sir John Simon calling a motion of no confidence in MacDonald's government, which was carried by a large majority. Asquith had gambled that neither Baldwin nor MacDonald would want to put the country through a third general election in two years, and that one of them would be forced to enter into a formal coalition with the Liberals. However, the gambit backfired when MacDonald instead called an election, knowing full well that a Conservative landslide was the only likely outcome, but himself gambling that it would be primarily at the expense of the Liberals. MacDonald's judgement proved correct, as the Liberals, who were still mostly dependent on former Prime Minister David Lloyd George for funds, ended up financially crippled from the very start of the campaign, while Labour were actually able to expand the scope of their own campaign thanks to increasing support from the workers' unions.

It is speculated that the combination of Labour forming its first government in January 1924 and the Zinoviev letter helped to stir up anti-socialist fears in Britain among many traditional anti-socialist Liberal voters, who then switched their support to the Conservative Party. This partly helps to explain the poor performance of the Liberal Party in the general election. The party also had financial difficulties which allowed it to contest only 339 seats, a lack of distinctive policies after the Conservative Party dropped their support for protected trade, and poor leadership under Asquith, who lost his own seat for the second time in six years. It would be the final election for Asquith, who was subsequently forced to lead the party from the House of Lords after being elevated to the Earldom of Oxford and Asquith the following year, with Lloyd George as Liberal chairman in the House of Commons. Declining health saw Asquith replaced as party leader by Lloyd George in 1926.

The fourth party in terms of number of candidates, number of seats and number of votes were not a party but a group of former National Liberals standing under the Constitutionalist label, led by Winston Churchill. They favoured Conservative/Liberal co-operation and had intended to formally organize as a party, but the election was called before they had the opportunity to actually do so. Three of the seven Constitutionalists elected, including Churchill, had been opposed by official Liberal candidates, and sat as Conservatives after the election. The other four sat as Liberals.

The refounded Sinn Féin ran Westminster candidates for the first time since March 1919; none came close to winning, with six of the eight losing their deposits. Its next Westminster election was in 1950.

Results 

|}

Votes summary

Seats summary

Transfers of seats 
 All comparisons are with the 1923 election.
In some cases the change is due to the MP defecting to the gaining party. Such circumstances are marked with a *.
In other circumstances the change is due to the seat having been won by the gaining party in a by-election in the intervening years, and then retained in 1924. Such circumstances are marked with a †.

1 Previous MP had defected to Labour by the time of the 1924 election

See also 
 List of MPs elected in the 1924 United Kingdom general election
 1924 United Kingdom general election in Northern Ireland

Notes

References

Further reading

 Adelman, Paul. The decline of the Liberal Party 1910-1931 (Routledge, 2014).

 
 Walker, Graham, and James Greer. "Religion, Labour, and National Questions: The General Election of 1924 in Belfast and Lanarkshire1." Labour History Review 84.3 (2019): 217-240.

External links
 United Kingdom election results—summary results 1885–1979

Manifestos
 1924 Conservative manifesto
 1924 Labour manifesto
 1924 Liberal manifesto

 
1924
General election
October 1924 events
Ramsay MacDonald
Stanley Baldwin